We're All in This Together is a Canadian comedy-drama film, directed by Katie Boland and released in 2021. An adaptation of the novel by Amy Jones, the film stars Boland in a dual role as Finn and Nicki Parker, estranged twin sisters who are forced into a media circus when their mother Kate (Martha Burns) goes viral on the internet with a video of her going over a waterfall in a barrel, and have to learn to set aside their differences in order to act like a proper family.

The film's cast also includes Alisha Newton, Adam Butcher, Madison Cheeatow, Jenny Raven, Jenna Warren, Nicole Stamp, Daniel Jun, Matilda Davidson, Matt Alfano and Sheldon Davis.

The film was shot in 2020 in Hamilton, Ontario.

The film was screened at various film festivals in the United States, before having its Canadian premiere at the 2021 Whistler Film Festival.

References

External links

We're All in This Together at Library and Archives Canada

2021 films
Canadian comedy-drama films
English-language Canadian films
Films based on Canadian novels
2020s English-language films
2020s Canadian films